Frontier Estate was a sugar plantation located in Port Maria, Jamaica. The estate covered 1.415 acres which were worked by 325 enslaved Africans in 1832. Following emancipation in 1834, the formerly enslaved Africans were obliged to remain on the plantations as "apprentices", whereby they worked as before for three-quarters of their time, but were free to sell their labour outside these hours. Originally planned to last eight years, public pressure brought these "apprenticeships" to an end in 1838. At this time there were 268 "apprentices".

References

Plantations in Jamaica
Saint Mary Parish, Jamaica